Lahiru Diyantha (born 28 June 1989) is a Sri Lankan cricketer. He made his first-class debut on 16 March 2012, for Police Sports Club in the 2011–12 Premier Trophy.

References

External links
 

1989 births
Living people
Sri Lankan cricketers
Sri Lanka Police Sports Club cricketers
Place of birth missing (living people)